Rasra is a constituency of the Uttar Pradesh Legislative Assembly covering the city of Rasra in the Ballia district of Uttar Pradesh, India.

Rasra is one of five assembly constituencies in the Ghosi Lok Sabha constituency. Since 2008, this assembly constituency is numbered 358 amongst 403 constituencies.

Currently the seat belongs to Bahujan Samaj Party candidate Umashankar Singh who won in last Assembly election of the 2017 Uttar Pradesh Legislative Elections defeating Bharatiya Janta Party candidate Ram Iqball Singh by a margin of 33,887 votes.

Election results

2022

Members of Legislative Assembly

References

External links
 

Assembly constituencies of Uttar Pradesh
Ballia district